Pomer may refer to:

 Pomer, Zaragoza, Spanish municipality
 Pomer, Croatia, Croatian village
 Joshua L. Pomer (born 1980), American film director, screenwriter, and producer

See also
 Pomerene (disambiguation)
 Scarlett Pomers (born 1988), American actress and singer-songwriter